John Francis Jobson (30 July 1899 – 22 November 1955) was  a former Australian rules footballer who played with Collingwood and Hawthorn in the Victorian Football League (VFL).

Family
The son of Thomas Jobson (1873–1944) and Mary Eliza Jobson (1874–1960), nee Anderson, John Francis Jobson was born at Fitzroy on 30 July 1899.

Football
Joining Collingwood from Richmond District in July 1924 Jobson played in five consecutive games before being suspended for elbowing Steve Donnellan of Fitzroy.

Jobson made one appearance for Collingwood in 1925, unsuccessfully applied for a clearance to North Melbourne, before joining Hawthorn for the 1926 VFL season. He made only one appearance before returning to Collingwood but he failed to play another senior game. Jobson played for Northcote in 1928 but returned to Collingwood again in 1929.

World War II
Jobson enlisted in the Australian Army in June 1940 and served in both the Middle East and New Guinea.

Death
Jack Jobson died at Ascot Vale on 22 November 1955 and is buried at Fawkner Memorial Park.

Notes

External links 

Jack Jobson's playing statistics from The VFA Project
Jack Jobson's profile at Collingwood Forever

1899 births
1955 deaths
Australian rules footballers from Melbourne
Collingwood Football Club players
Hawthorn Football Club players
Northcote Football Club players
Australian Army personnel of World War II
People from Fitzroy, Victoria
Military personnel from Melbourne